Events from the year 1992 in Portuguese Macau.

Incumbents
 President Mário Soares
 Governor - Vasco Joaquim Rocha Vieira

Events

 
Years of the 20th century in Macau
Macau
Macau
1990s in Macau